Alfred H. Ricketts (born February 1870) was an English professional golfer who played in the late 19th and early 20th century.

Early life
In 1888, Ricketts emigrated from England to the United States and took a job as a golf instructor at the Country Club of Rochester in Rochester, New York, where he instructed Rochester-born Walter Hagen and others on the finer points of golf. In 1900 he married Nettie Brooks and born to them was a son, Albert G. Ricketts, circa 1902.

Golf career
Ricketts tied for sixth place, with Bernard Nicholls, in the 1897 U.S. Open, held at Chicago Golf Club in Wheaton, Illinois. He got off to a poor start with an opening round 91 but with a full 10-shot improvement in round two at 81 he finished high on the leaderboard. He didn't win any prize money; only the top-5 finishers received a prize. Ricketts also had a tenth place finish in the 1896 U.S. Open by carding rounds of 80-83=163.

Later life
By 1910, his wife had died and he was a widower. In 1930, likely as a result of the Great Depression, he was no longer in the golf business but rather was working as a packer and stamper in a metal fabrication factory.

Death
Ricketts' date of death is unknown.

Results in major championships

Note: Ricketts played only in the U.S. Open.

"T" indicates a tie for a place
? = unknown
Yellow background for top-10

References

English male golfers
English emigrants to the United States
1870 births
Year of death missing